Vlahos or Vlachos, feminine: Vlahou, is a Greek surname, meaning Vlach.

The surname Vlahos/Vlachos may refer to:

Alexander Vlahos, Welsh actor, known for playing Mordred on Merlin
Eros Vlahos, English actor, known from Game of Thrones
Helen Vlachos, Greek journalist and newspaper editor in the 60's, daughter of Georgios
Dionisios Vlachos, American Professor of chemical engineering
Georgios Vlachos, Greek journalist, creator of Kathimerini, a  daily newspaper in Greece
Leesa Vlahos, Australian former politician
Michalis Vlachos, Greek footballer
Petro Vlahos, American engineer, bluescreen/special effects pioneer
Terpsichori Chryssoulaki-Vlachou, Greek WWII resistance member
Tony Vlachos, winner of Survivor: Cagayan
Vangelis Vlachos, Greek footballer
William Vlachos, American footballer
Zachary Vlahos, American Olympic rower

See also 
 Volokh (disambiguation)
 Wallach (disambiguation)

Greek-language surnames
Ethnonymic surnames